The music for the 2011 neo-noir detective video game L.A. Noire, developed by Team Bondi and published by Rockstar Games, was composed by musicians Andrew Hale and Simon Hale. Recorded at Abbey Road Studios in London, the score also features contributions from Woody Jackson, who had collaborated with Rockstar on other projects both previously and since. Andrew Hale felt that composing the game's score was about setting a mood, attempting to compose music that felt accessible to players. The score was inspired by films from the 1940s, though the team avoided specifically composing for this time period, instead opting to focus on that after the music had been produced. Three supplementary vocal recordings were composed by The Real Tuesday Weld and performed by Claudia Brücken; they also sought to fit with the game's setting.

The soundtrack album for L.A. Noire was released in May 2011. A second soundtrack, entitled L.A. Noire Remixed EP, was released on the same day, consisting of six jazz classics remixed by contemporary DJs. Critical reception to the soundtracks was positive, as reviewers felt that the music connected appropriately with the gameplay and time period. The game's music was nominated for numerous awards.

Production and composition 

L.A. Noire features an original score. The game's score accompanies the gameplay, alerting players at specific times; musical cues play when players approach items of interest during investigations. Like other games published by Rockstar, L.A. Noire also contains licensed music tracks provided by an in-game radio. Over thirty songs, from artists such as Billie Holiday, Louis Armstrong and Ella Fitzgerald, feature in the game. To work on the score, the team engaged Andrew Hale and Simon Hale. Recorded at Abbey Road Studios, the score was inspired by orchestral scores from 1940s films. Music supervisor Ivan Pavlovich stated that Rockstar's focus on authenticity and realism inspired the composers to reflect the focus in the music. Andrew Hale felt that composing the game's score was a flexible process "about setting a mood", as opposed to a "mechanical" process in which the music was specifically composed to fit with the time frames of the game; the composers decided to focus on the latter after the music was produced. They also attempted to compose something that felt accessible to players, avoiding exclusively focusing on swing or jazz. Andrew Hale felt that the orchestral score assisted in this.

To assist with the score, Rockstar engaged Woody Jackson, who had previously collaborated with the team on the music of Red Dead Redemption (2010). Jackson re-orchestrated one of the themes and wrote much of the in-game music. While the game's score largely uses a live orchestra, Jackson found that this led to difficulties with interactive music as the player can hear the loop; inspired by film noir and the works of musicians like Bernard Herman, Jackson departed from the existing music and wrote original tracks in about a month. In addition to the original score and licensed tracks, the game also features original vocal recordings that "create an authentic sound to suit the musical identity of the period". When The Real Tuesday Weld were commissioned to compose the original compositions, they sought vocals that could "evoke the period", ultimately falling upon Claudia Brücken. Three vocal tracks were produced: "(I Always Kill) The Things I Love", "Guilty", and "Torched Song".

Albums

L.A. Noire Official Soundtrack

L.A. Noire Official Soundtrack comprises songs from the game, composed and produced by Andrew Hale and Simon Hale. The soundtrack spans 28 tracks, covering a duration of 55 minutes, and features additional songs composed and performed by The Real Tuesday Weld and Claudia Brücken. It was first released on the iTunes Store on 17 May 2011, alongside L.A. Noire Remixed. The score was recorded at Abbey Road Studios in London. Woody Jackson composed incidental music.

In the context of the game, the soundtrack was well received. Kirk Hamilton of Kotaku ranked it upon the best game music of 2011, appreciating the "vibe" that it sets for the genre and time period of the game. Jen Bosier of Video Game Writers commended the soundtrack's recreation of the time period, and felt that the music could be enjoyed outside the game. Evan Andra of SF Critic echoed these remarks, and particularly praised the final three vocal tracks of the album, calling them "a suitably enjoyable conclusion to the album". David Smyth of London Evening Standard named the three vocal tracks "tense and beautiful", and wrote that the overall soundtrack is "mood music of the finest calibre". James Southall of Movie Wave wrote that the soundtrack assisted in the creation of the game's atmosphere, and particularly praised the album's "action music". Simon Elchlepp of Video Game Music Online wrote that the soundtrack "successfully recreates several aspects of 1940s' jazz and movie scores", praising Hale's understanding of the music type.

The soundtrack won the award for Original Music at the 8th British Academy Games Awards, and was nominated for Best Original Score for a Video Game or Interactive Media at the 2011 International Film Music Critics Association Awards. The soundtrack was also nominated for Best Score — Contemporary/Alternative from Video Game Music Online.

L.A. Noire Remixed EP

L.A. Noire Remixed consists of six jazz classics from the game's era, remixed by contemporary DJs. Advertised as a "special installment" of the Verve Remixed Series, the album includes songs by artists of the period, such as Ella Fitzgerald, Lionel Hampton, Billie Holiday and Dinah Washington, remixed by DJs such as Ticklah, DJ Premier, and Moodymann. It was first released on the iTunes Store on 17 May 2011, alongside the game's main soundtrack.

The album received generally positive reviews. Bosier of Video Game Writers dubbed it "the gem of the collection", stating that it invokes "the feeling of the game", as well as involving "a nice retro-vibe". Smyth of London Evening Standard commended the soundtrack, calling the songs "tastefully modernised". The album was nominated for Best Album – Remix from Video Game Music Online.

References

External links 
 

L.A. Noire
L.A. Noire
L.A. Noire
L.A. Noire